Campaign Cartographer is a Windows map creation program created by ProFantasy Software originally in 1993.

Description
The program is designed to draw maps for role playing and miniature war games. The CAD engine is based on FastCAD, although most of code is written by the publishers. It includes a variety of add-ons for different genres, including fantasy, modern and science fiction. Campaign Cartographer 3, was released on 30 June 2006 and has since been updated 9 times. There are currently 9 add-ons for Campaign Cartographer; 6 drawing add-ons that add tools, templates, and symbol catalogs and 3 symbol set add-ons consisting of thousands of symbols. Campaign Cartographer has been used to illustrate novels such as Shades of Gray by Lisanne Norman, Le Temple Des Eaux-Mortes by Eric Ferris, and Johannes Cabal the Detective by Jonathan L. Howard. The Forgotten Realms Interactive Atlas, published by TSR, Inc. in 1999, was likewise constructed using Campaign Cartographer.

Add ons 
The following are commercial add-ons available for the Campaign Cartographer tool.

Reception
In the September 1994 edition of Dragon (Issue 209), Lester W. Smith found Campaign Cartographer almost too good, and the 334-page manual almost too much, saying, "For those who like to invest multiple hours into creating detailed maps for their campaigns, and who have the hardware to take advantage of the program, the Campaign Cartographer software allows them to create, store, modify, and copy maps more beautiful than they could have hoped before. But for GMs with limited time to spend, the program may just be too much." However, Smith concluded that too much program was better than too little program, and gave this an above average rating of 5 out of 6, saying, "The Campaign Cartographer software is sort of like a limousine of mapping programs, and some people might be better served with a rough-and-ready truck. On the other hand, this limousine isn't that expensive, and playing with its multitude of 'buttons' and 'switches' is a lot of fun."

In the December 1995 edition of Arcane (Issue 1), Andy Butcher reviewed both Campaign Cartographer and Dungeon Designer.
 Butcher admired Campaign Cartographer, giving it an above average rating of 8 out of 10 and saying, "Campaign Cartographer is an incredible program. It really does make it easy to create highly detailed maps of anything from a planet to a small forest."
 He was even more enthusiastic about  Dungeon Designer, giving it an excellent rating of 9 out of 10 and commenting, "Considering how often these kind of maps are needed in most games, this makes Dungeon Designer even more useful than Campaign Cartographer for most gamers, which is high praise indeed."

Two issues later, in the February 1996 edition of Arcane (Issue 3), Butcher gave City Designer an average rating of 7 out of 10, saying "If you're lucky enough to [have access to your computer during your game] then City Designer'''s very handy indeed. On the other hand, if all you want to do is create maps to print out, Dungeon Designer is far more useful overall."

ReviewsShadis #14Shadis #24 (Feb., 1996)Arcane #14 (Christmas 1996) - Campaign Cartographer Pro / Campaign Cartographer PerspectivesRollespilsmagasinet Fønix'' (Danish) (Issue 11 - Dec/Jan 1995)

See also 
 List of role-playing game software

References

External links
 ProFantasy website
 Video Tutorials on using Campaign Cartographer
 Review of Campaign Cartographer at RPG.net
 Free Maps of Fantasy Worlds created with CC3

Computer-aided design software
Role-playing game software